Vintage Country: Old But Treasured is a studio album by the American country music artist Jeannie Seely. It was released on February 1, 2011, by Cheyenne Records and was produced by Seely. The album is a collection of classic country songs that had previously beenrecorded by other music artists. It was Seely's first studio album since 2003 and the fifteenth studio album released during her career.

Background and content
According to Seely, she performed the songs on Vintage Country: Old But Treasured in her own interpretations. "In recording this CD, it wasn't my intention to 'cover' any of these great performances by some of the most talented artists of our time, but rather to do these wonderful songs in the way I hear and feel them...for me," she commented in the album liner notes. In a 2011 interview, she explained her rationale for naming the album. "I wanted to call this project Vintage Country because the 'Vintage' part means 'old, but treasured'," she said.

The album has 12 tracks, all recorded at the Hilltop Studio in Madison, Tennessee. Seely praised the venue in the liner notes, calling it "a studio whose doors have never been closed". The sessions were produced by Seely herself, her third studio album to be self-produced. The project included cover versions of songs by both male and female country artists between the 1950s and 1970s. The tenth track, "Blanket on the Ground", was first recorded by Billie Jo Spears, with whom Seely performed occasionally. "Billie Jo and I shared many memorable moments during our heyday, we had such a good time reminiscing when we toured Ireland together recently. I haven't stopped humming 'Blanket' since then," she commented. She was inspired to record "Funny How Time Slips Away" following a tribute performance to Billy Walker, the song's original artist. Two duet recordings are also on the project.

Release and reception
Vintage Country was released on February 1, 2011, by Cheyenne Records, a company created by Seely herself, as both a compact disc and a music download. The album did not receive any placements on any Billboard charts following its release. However, the album did receive positive reviews from music critics and writers. Nashville Music Guide called the album a set of "classic country songs", highlighting the tunes "Funny How Time Slips Away" and "What a Way to Live".

Track listing

Personnel
All credits are adapted from the liner notes of Vintage Country: Old But Treasured.

Musical personnel
 Tim Atwood – piano, duet vocals
 Danny Davis – bass, duet vocals
 Dug Grieves – guitar, session leader
 Jerry Ray Johnston – drums
 Roger Morris – piano
 Dawn Sears – background vocals
 Kenny Sears – fiddle
 Jeannie Seely – lead vocals
 Tommy White – steel guitar

Technical personnel 
 Hatcher & Fell – cover photo
 Ron Harman – design
 John Nicholson – engineering
 Jeannie Seely – producer

Release history

References

2011 albums
Albums produced by Jeannie Seely
Jeannie Seely albums